William Merchant may refer to:

 William Alfred Merchant, English dwarf clown
William Merchant (MP) for Wycombe (UK Parliament constituency)
William Moelwyn Merchant, academic, novelist, sculptor, poet and Anglican priest

See also